Mikelle Louise Budge, professionally known as Mary Mack (born July 25, 1975), is an American comedian, musician, and writer. Mack currently stars as Jesse Wearsprada Solar-Opposites in the Justin Roiland-produced animated sitcom Solar Opposites, which debuted May 8, 2020 on Hulu. She has released five albums of her stand-up.

Early life 
Mack was born in Minnesota to parents from Duluth and raised near Webster, Wisconsin.

She has a bachelor's degree in music from the University of Wisconsin-Oshkosh, and an MFA in conducting from Middle Tennessee State University.
She taught music at the elementary and middle school levels in Oshkosh, Wisconsin, and Nashville, Tennessee, and led a polka band in Nashville before moving to Minneapolis, Minnesota, to pursue a career in comedy.

Career 
Mack describes herself as a "folk humorist," using storytelling and her strong northern-Wisconsin accent as part of her comedy, playing off of the Fargo stereotype of Midwesterners in a way that Mack has described as blending Gilda Radner and Garrison Keillor. Chris Spector of Midwest Record notes that the seeming innocence of Mack's "little-girl voice and demeanor ... gives Mack an edge. Mack's zingers hit harder since she lulls you into this place where you just don't expect it." A classically trained musician with two degrees, she often plays mandolin as part of her act. She has performed at SF Sketchfest, the Vancouver Comedy Fest, the Andy Kaufman Awards, and the Just For Laughs Festival in Montreal.

TV and radio appearances 
Before Solar Opposites, in which she voices Jesse Wearsprada Solar-Opposites, Mack voiced the character Dylan Beekler in the first season of Golan the Insatiable and made a guest appearance as a drunken Zeeble in Aqua Teen Hunger Force. Mack's other TV appearances include Last Comic Standing in 2014, Conan, Comedy Central's Live at Gotham, and Last Call with Carson Daly.

Mack has been featured on WTF with Marc Maron, The Bob & Tom Show, XM's National Lampoon Comedy Radio, Wits, and Minnesota Polka Spotlight.

Discography
Mack has released five albums of her stand-up. Jake Kroeger of the Comedy Bureau called her 2015 album Pig Woman "especially mischievous and fun" with a "down-to-earth, Midwestern zeitgeist". Richard Lanoie of the Serious Comedy Site called the album "an absolute hoot" and "absolutely fearless".

Either You Wake Up or You Don't (2007)
Pinch Finger Girl: A Tragedomedy (2009)
"Happy Father's Day" (digital single, 2009)
Pig Woman (Stand Up! Records, 2015)
Mrs. Taco Man (2019)
Comedy Bootleg 2020 (2020)

Video Games 
 Doobie Dooper – Trover Saves the Universe
 Jesse Wearsprada Solar-Opposites – Warped Kart Racers

Personal life 
Mack is married to fellow comedian Tim Harmston; they frequently tour together.

References

External links
Mary Mack official site

Mary Mack at Stand Up! Records website

Living people
American women comedians
1975 births
People from Nashville, Tennessee
People from Burnett County, Wisconsin
Actresses from Wisconsin
Actresses from Minnesota
University of Wisconsin–Oshkosh alumni
21st-century American comedians
Polka musicians
Stand Up! Records artists
American stand-up comedians
Comedians from Minnesota
Comedians from Wisconsin
Middle Tennessee State University alumni
21st-century American women